The brown-rumped foliage-gleaner (Automolus melanopezus) is a species of bird in the family Furnariidae.
It is found in the western Amazon Basin (mainly Peru, Ecuador and western Brazil).
Its natural habitats are subtropical or tropical moist lowland forest and subtropical or tropical swampland.

References

brown-rumped foliage-gleaner
Birds of the Amazon Basin
Birds of the Ecuadorian Amazon
Birds of the Peruvian Amazon
brown-rumped foliage-gleaner
brown-rumped foliage-gleaner
Taxonomy articles created by Polbot